Ephraim Hart (1747 - July 16, 1825) was an American merchant who helped to organize the Board of Stock-Brokers, now known as the New York Stock Exchange.

Biography 
Hart was born in Fürth, a city in the region of Franconia which lies now in Bavaria, Germany. Since 1440, a prospering Jewish community existed in Fürth. Hart's original surname was Hirz which he changed when he came to the United States. 

By 1782, he was residing as a merchant in Philadelphia, and in that year he joined the Mickvé Israel congregation. He married in 1783 Frances Noah, a sister of Manuel Noah, and their son was Joel Hart. Later he removed to New York and engaged in the commission and brokerage business. On April 2, 1787, he was registered as an elector of the Shearith Israel congregation. 

By 1792, he had become one of the most successful merchants in the City, and at this time he helped to organize the Board of Stock-Brokers, now known as the New York Stock Exchange, being one of the signatories of the Buttonwood Agreement of 1792 that founded the Exchange. His name also appears in 1799 in a "list of owners of houses and lots valued at £2,000 or more." He was one of the founders, in 1802, of the ebra Hesed Veemet, a charitable organization connected with the Shearith Israel congregation. He owned at least one enslaved Black woman named "Silvia". He died in New York City and is buried at the Second Cemetery of Shearith Israel on 11th Street, near Avenue of the Americas (6th Avenue). His gravestone reads "Ephraim Hart / Pennsylvania / Pvt Capt Henry Graham's Co / Rev War / July 16, 1824"

References 
 

American merchants
American people of German-Jewish descent
People from Fürth
Businesspeople from New York City
1747 births
1825 deaths
Ephraim
People of colonial Pennsylvania